Weinheim (Bergstraße) Hauptbahnhof is a station in the town of Weinheim in the German state of Baden-Württemberg. It is served by Intercity services on the Main-Neckar Railway between Frankfurt and Heidelberg/Mannheim. The Weschnitz Valley Railway (Weschnitztalbahn) to Furth in the Odenwald starts at Weinheim station. There is also a freight railway to Viernheim, the last remaining section of the former Weinheim–Worms railway.

History

The first Weinheim station was opened here with the opening of the Main-Neckar Railway from Frankfurt am Main to Heidelberg and Mannheim on 1 August 1846. With the opening of the Weinheim–Worms railway in 1905, the station received new signal systems. In 1909, the station layout was extended, for which a construction division of the Grand Duchy of Baden State Railway had been established on 1 June 1909.

The station building was substantially renovated and the canopy of the "home" platform was refurbished as part of an economic stimulus program from 2008/09 to 2011.

From 2015 to 2017, platforms A, B and C (tracks 1–4) were renewed and adapted for the disabled, increased to a height of 76 cm and each fitted with a passenger lift. In addition, an entrance was built from the west side. This cost about €8.71 million. The municipality and the district each provided €1.63 m of the costs, while the state of Baden-WÜrttemberg provided €1.88 m. The renovation was also funded with €3.57 m under the federal Municipal Transport Financing Act (Gemeindeverkehrsfinanzierungsgesetz).

The station was renamed from Weinheim (Bergstr) to Weinheim (Bergstr) Hbf in August 2018.

Public transport 
The station is connected by the Oberrheinische Eisenbahn-Gesellschaft (Upper Rhine Railway Company, OEG) with the rest of the Rhine-Neckar region. It runs from here to Viernheim, Mannheim and Heidelberg. The OEG stop at Weinheim station is called Luisenstraße, while the OEG's own Weinheim station is about 400 metres further south.

There is a bus connection to city and regional lines and a call taxi service.

Rail services

Long-distance services

Regional and S-Bahn services

Regionalbahn service RB 68 runs hourly to Frankfurt (Main) or Heidelberg. It combination with line S6 of the Rhine-Neckar S-Bahn, there is an approximately half-hour cycle between Bensheim and Neu-Edingen/Friedrichsfeld during the day. Every two hours, there is a Regional-Express service to Frankfurt (Main) and Mannheim. Regionalbahn service RB 69 serves the Weschnitz Valley every half hour; services run hourly on the weekend.

Platforms 

Weinheim station has six platform tracks. Tracks 1, 5 and 6 are used for the Weschnitz Valley Railway and the other three tracks are used by passenger and freight trains on the Main-Neckar Railway. In the event of unscheduled overtaking moves by freight or long-distance trains, commuter trains to Frankfurt use track 1. The platforms are connected by two subways.

Freight 
In earlier times, Weinheim station had a large and busy freight and marshalling yard. Its largest customer was the Freudenberg Group, which was based in Weinheim and transported its goods via rail over a dedicated connection. Today, most tracks have been removed, only the overgrown track area and the signal boxes are still preserved.

References

Railway stations in Baden-Württemberg
Railway stations in Germany opened in 1846
station